The Secretary of Consumer Affairs of Puerto Rico is responsible of defending and protecting consumers in Puerto Rico and leads the Department of Consumer Affairs (DACO). The position is appointed by the governor with advice and consent from the Senate. The Secretary from 2013 to 2016 was Nery Adamés Soto. The current Secretary is Hiram Torres Montalvo.

List of Secretaries of Consumer Affairs of Puerto Rico

 2005–2009: Alejandro García Padilla
 2009–2012: Luis G. Rivera Marín
 2012–2013: Omar Marrero
 2013–2016: Nery Adamés Soto
 2017–2019: Michael Pierluisi
 2022–current: Hiram Torres Montalvo

References

Council of Secretaries of Puerto Rico
Department of Consumer Affairs of Puerto Rico